Malawania is an extinct genus of basal thunnosaur ichthyosaur known from the middle Early Cretaceous (Hauterivian or Barremian stage) of Iraq. Malawania was named by Valentin Fischer, Robert M. Appleby, Darren Naish, Jeff Liston, Riding, J. B., Brindley, S. and Pascal Godefroit in 2013 and the type species is Malawania anachronus. It is unusual as it is much more primitive than other Cretaceous ichthyosaurs, being most closely related to Ichthyosaurus from the Late Triassic and Early Jurassic, over 70 million years earlier than Malawania, with all other known ichthyosaurs from the Late Jurassic onwards belonging to the family Ophthalmosauridae.

Discovery 
The holotype and only known specimen was discovered in 1952 by British petroleum geologists D. M. Morton, F. R. S. Henson, R. J. Wetzel and L. C. F. Damesin while working in Chia Gara, Amadia in Iraqi Kurdistan. The slab was being used to dam a small river and was part of a mule track. It was then transported back to the UK and donated to the Natural History Museum in 1959. Robert M. Appleby would study the specimen for many years until his death in 2004, but never published a paper, one manuscript submitted to Paleontology in 1979 was rejected due to the uncertain provenance of the specimen. The specimen was formally described in 2013 by Fischer and colleagues. Using palynology it was determined that the rocks surrounding the specimen were Hauterivian-Barremian in age, which was unexpected given the archaic nature of the specimen.

Description
Each lacrimal (paired bones at the front edges of the orbits) bears a hollow towards its front edge. Fischer and colleagues speculated that these may have been the location of the lacrimal glands (which produce the tear film). The long, backwards projecting processes of the lacrimals extend halfway underneath the orbits (eye sockets). The eyeballs were supported by rings of 13 bones, known as sclerotic rings.

Malawania has a minimum of five neck vertebrae. While the boundary between them is still demarcated, the first two vertebrae are fused. All of the known centra (vertebral bodies) are the same length, save for the first, which has a length double that of the rest. In some of the trunk vertebrae, the forwards-placed facets for the ribs flow smoothly together with the edges of the vertebrae. The well-spaced neural spines towards the front of the animal have trapezoidal tops, a unique feature of this genus. The cross sections of the ribs are bilobed.

Unlike baracromians, the scapulae (shoulder blades) of Malawania have unemarginated front surfaces. The trapezoid-shaped humeri (upper arm bones) are unusually short, a morphology unique to this genus. The upper end of each humerus bears a backwards-pointing projection known as a capitular process. This trait is also unique to Malawania, with the processes of other ichthyosaurs being semicircular. The humeri do not narrow at their middle, an atypical trait outside of Ophthalmosauridae. The lower ends of the humeri do not broaden significantly, each articulating with two bones, the radius and ulna. These two six-sided bones are elongate and contact each other across the entirety of their inner margins, without an opening between them.

With the exception of the quadrangular radiales (carpals below the radii), most of the hand bones of Malawania are hexagon-shaped and tightly interlocked, similar to Macgowania. The intermedia (a pair of wrist bones) approach the size of the radii, distinctive of Malawania. Two digits originate from each intermedium, similar to Ichthyosaurus. There are two other digits in the foreflippers of Malawania for a total of four. The first digit would have had more than nine phalanges (digit bones) when complete, the first of these bearing a notch.

Taxonomy 
The name is derived from "Kurdish ‘Malawan’: swimmer and Latinized Greek noun in apposition ‘anachronus’ meaning ‘out of time’."

Phylogeny
Malawania was found to be the sister taxon to Ichthyosaurus. Below is a cladogram modified from Fischer et al., 2013.

See also

 List of ichthyosaurs
 Timeline of ichthyosaur research

References

Early Cretaceous ichthyosaurs
Early Cretaceous reptiles of Asia
Natural history of Iraq
Fossil taxa described in 2013
Taxa named by Darren Naish
Ichthyosauromorph genera